BindView Development Corporation (NASDAQ: BVEW) was an American software company founded in 1990 by Eric Pulaski. Pulaski remained as chairman of the board and chief executive officer until the acquisition by Symantec Corporation in January 2006.

BindView started out as "The LAN Support Group" (LSG) and was a developer of a bindery viewer product for the Novell platform called BindView. 

In 1995, the company changed names from The LAN Support Group to BindView and developed into a supplier of Novell and Microsoft Windows directory administration, vulnerability management and policy assessment and management software, providing customers with the tools to assess, discover and remediate network, hardware or application anomalies.

References

Software companies based in California
Gen Digital acquisitions
Defunct software companies of the United States